The anime television series No Guns Life is based on the manga series of the same name written and illustrated by Tasuku Karasuma. The series adaptation was announced in the April issue of Shueisha's Ultra Jump magazine on March 18, 2019.

The animation by Madhouse is produced by Egg Firm and directed by Naoyuki Itō, with Yukie Sugawara handling series composition, Masanori Shino designing the characters, and Kenji Kawai composing the music. Its 3DCG backgrounds were created by Cyclone Graphics, the studio that also produced the series' ending animation, using Unreal Engine 4.

The series ran for 24 episodes in two parts. The first half of the series (containing Episodes 1 to 12) aired from October 10 to December 26, 2019 on TBS, AT-X, SUN, KBS, and BS11. The second half of the series (containing Episodes 13 to 24) was slated to premiere on April 9, 2020, but its airdate was delayed from July 9 to September 24, 2020 due to COVID-19.

 performed the series' opening theme "Motor City" while  performed the series' ending theme "Game Over." Funimation licensed the series for simulcast and an English dub.


Episode list

Home Media release

Japanese

English

Notes

References

No Guns Life